Debelle is a French surname. Notable people with the surname include:

Alexandre Debelle (1805-1897), French painter, designer, and lithographer
Anne Debelle, Princesse d'Essling (1802-1887), French courtier
César Alexandre Debelle (1770-1826), French general
Jean-François Joseph Debelle (1767-1802), French general and soldier
Speech Debelle (born 1983), real name Corynne Elliot, British rapper

See also
DeBell
Debel (disambiguation)